Patrick Yvonne Hugo Dewael, (born 13 October 1955) is a liberal Belgian politician. A member of the Flemish Liberals and Democrats (Vlaamse Liberalen en Democraten, VLD), he served as Minister-President of Flanders from 1999 to 2003.

He is the nephew of the late Herman Vanderpoorten and the cousin of Marleen Vanderpoorten, who served as Minister of Education in the Flemish Government led by Dewael. He obtained a degree in law and notariat from the Vrije Universiteit Brussel in Brussels. Dewael served as the President of the Chamber of Representatives from 2019 to 2020 and previously from 2008 to 2010.

Political career
He was first elected to the Belgian Parliament in 1985. From 1985 to 1992 Dewael served for the PVV as Flemish minister of Culture in the governments led by Gaston Geens (II, III and IV). After the defeat of the liberals at the 1992 elections, Dewael served as an opposition MP until the liberals regained power in 1999.

He was Minister-President of the regional government of Flanders from 1999 to 2003. After the Federal elections of 2003, Dewael resigned as minister-president in order to serve as deputy prime minister and minister of the interior in the Belgian Federal government led by Guy Verhofstadt.

When Kurdish militant Fehriye Erdal was sentenced to 4 years' imprisonment by a Bruges court on 28 February 2006, it turned out that she had shaken off the Belgian secret service, which had had the responsibility of following her since 23 February 2006 (Erdal had been under house arrest since 2000). Both the Minister of Justice, Laurette Onkelinx, and the Minister of the Interior, Patrick Dewael came under fire for this incident.

He was deputy prime minister and minister for interior in the Leterme I Government, which took office on 20 March 2008. On 31 December 2008, he became president of the Chamber of Representatives. He was replaced as interior minister by Guido De Padt.

Private life
Patrick Dewael lives in Tongeren, a town of which he is also the mayor.

Patrick Dewael was married to Marleen Van Doren, with whom he has three children. On 24 August 2005 Dewael released a press communiqué in which he announced that he was leaving his wife for VRT journalist . On 19 July 2019 he married Op de Beeck.

Honours 

 2014 : Knight Grand Cross in the Order of Leopold II.
 2002 : Knight Grand Cross Order of Merit of the Italian Republic, decree of 14/10/2002

References

External links
Patrick Dewael (Official website)

|-

|-

|-

|-

1955 births
Belgian Ministers of State
Vrije Universiteit Brussel alumni
Living people
Presidents of the Chamber of Representatives (Belgium)
Members of the Belgian Federal Parliament
Ministers-President of Flanders
Open Vlaamse Liberalen en Democraten politicians
People from Lier, Belgium
Recipients of the Grand Cross of the Order of Leopold II
21st-century Belgian politicians